Mariatrost is the 11th district of the Austrian city of Graz.

The Mariatrost Basilica, a famous pilgrimage site, is situated within the district, as is the Graz Tramway Museum.

References 
 

Districts of Graz